The California Prison Industry Authority (CALPIA) manages over 100 manufacturing, service, and consumable industries within the 35 California Department of Corrections and Rehabilitation (CDCR) institutions. It is overseen by the 11-member Prison Industry Board, which is chaired by the CDCR Secretary.   CALPIA has more than 8,000 offender assignments in career technical education programs, manufacturing, agricultural, consumable, and service enterprises. CALPIA's administration offices are in Folsom, CA.

Statutory Objectives
(Under the Penal Code Sections 2800-2818):

 To develop and operate industrial, agricultural and service enterprises that provide work opportunities for offenders under the jurisdiction of CDCR, and to serve government agencies with products and services commensurate with their needs.
 To create and maintain working conditions as similar as possible to those of private industry, to help offenders work productively to earn funds, and to acquire or improve effective work habits and occupational skills.
 To operate self-supporting offender work programs through the generation of funds from the sale of products and services, avoiding the costs of alternative CDCR offender programs. (CALPIA receives no annual appropriation from the legislature.)

Organization 
CALPIA is a self-supporting state entity that reduces recidivism, increases prison safety, and enhances public safety by providing offenders productive work and training opportunities. Its program goals support CDCR's public safety mission by producing trained offenders with job skills, good work habits, basic education and job support in the community, giving them the best post-release chances of not returning to prison. CALPIA offenders receive industry-accredited certifications that employers seek.

Over a three-year period, beginning in Fiscal Year (FY) 2008-09, CALPIA participants returned to prison, on average, 26–38% less often than offenders released from the CDCR general population, saving the General Fund millions in incarceration costs [1]. Additionally, CALPIA's Career Technical Education (CTE) programs have some of the lowest recidivism rates in the country, with a cumulative rate of 7.13% [2]. In 2018, CALPIA will report the recidivism among offenders who have participated in CALPIA programs between FY's 2010-11 and 2014-18.

History and Oversight
California Correctional Industries was formed in 1947, and renamed California Prison Industry Authority in 1982. CALPIA manages over 100 manufacturing, service, and consumable enterprises in 34 California Department of Corrections and Rehabilitation (CDCR) institutions, with over 7,500 offender assignments.

CALPIA is overseen by the Prison Industry Board, which acts like a corporate board of directors. The 11-member board is chaired by the CDCR secretary. The governor appoints four members: two representing organized labor, and two representing industry. The Speaker of the California Assembly and the Senate Rules Committee each appoint two members representing the general public. The Secretary of Transportation (or designee) and the Director of General Services (or designee) also serve on the board.

Customer Base 
The goods and services produced by CALPIA's enterprises are sold predominately to departments of the State of California, as well as to other government entities.

CDCR is CALPIA's largest customer and accounted for 59.2% of sales in FY 2016-17. Other state customers include:
 Department of Motor Vehicles (DMV)
 Department of State Hospitals (DSH)
 Department of Health Care Services (DHCS)
 Department of Transportation (Caltrans)
 Department of Forestry and Fire Protection (CAL FIRE)
 California Highway Patrol (CHP)
 California Department of Veterans Affairs (CalVet)
 Department of General Services (DGS)
 California Military Department
 Department of Parks and Recreation (DPR)

Financial Benefits to State Agencies and Taxpayers 
CALPIA's offender programming saves the state's General Fund millions of dollars annually through lower offender recidivism. It also saves CDCR millions by providing over 7,000 alternatively funded programming slots for offenders that CDCR does not have to fund.

To achieve its mission, CALPIA has four main strategic and business goals:
 Reducing offender recidivism
 Maintaining self-sufficiency
 Developing high-performing staff and organization
 Increasing customer satisfaction

Accredited Certifications 
CALPIA invests in curriculum for offenders, offering more than 120 nationally recognized accredited certifications, such as AutoCAD, computer coding, dental technology, food handling, laundry, agriculture, welding, metal-stamping, industrial safety and health, electrical systems, mechanical systems, and maintenance. CALPIA offenders may also earn certificates of proficiency in occupational disciplines to validate skills and abilities obtained during their time employed by CALPIA.

In FY 2016-2017, 559 CALPIA participants received Proficiency and or Standard Occupational Code Proficiency certification, and 4,540 successfully completed an accredited certification program—a 9% increase for both from FT 2015-2016. The increase was caused primarily by the opening of IEP enrollment to all CALPIA offenders into TPC Training Systems course 109.1, Industrial Safety and Health, and the ongoing activation of the Healthcare Facilities Maintenance program at all institutions.

See Also 
 Penal labor in the United States
 Prison–industrial complex
 Incarceration in the United States
 Critical Resistance

References

Penal Code Sections 2800-2818

1 CALPIA Economic Impact Report FY 2012-13. https://www.calpia.ca.gov/news/reports-and-publications/economic-impact-report-2012-13/

2 Prison Industry Board CTE Report FY 2007-2008 to FY 2010-2011. https://www.calpia.ca.gov/news/reports-and-publications/cte-education-assessment-report-fy-2007-2008-to-2010-2011/

3 Report to the Legislature Fiscal Year 2016-17. https://www.calpia.ca.gov/news/reports-and-publications/report-to-the-legislature-fiscal-year-2016-17/

External links 
 
 California Prison Industry Authority in the California Code of Regulations
 California Prison Industry Board in the California Code of Regulations

Prison Industry Authority
Penal system in California